The Porto Botanical Garden is a botanical garden located in the gardens of the Campo Alegre Estate or Andresen House, in Porto, Portugal.

History 
Campo Alegre Estate previously belonged to the French physician Jean Pierre Salabert. It was confiscated in 1820, later became the property of John José da Costa and Arnaldo Ribeiro Barbosa. In 1895, João Henrique Andresen purchased the Campo Alegre Estate. This Port wine dealer would later recuperate the gardens of the estate, imposing the romantic style that was popular at that time. Two members of the Andresen family would later become famous writers: Sophia de Mello Breyner and Ruben A., who lived in the estate and whose memories provide an historic record of the evolution of the gardens.

The Portuguese state acquired the estate in 1949, converting it in 1951 in the Porto Botanical Garden. Since then, it has been managed by the Faculty of Sciences of the University of Porto and by the Gonçalo Sampaio Botanical Institute (which was later extinguished). The current head of the Botanical Garden is the landscape architect Teresa Andresen, a descendant of the former owners of the estate, with Professors Arnaldo Rozeira, Roberto Salema and Barreto Caldas da Costa preceding her.

Following the construction of roads and a university sports center, the property later lost 8 of its 12 hectares. In compensation, the Burmester Estate garden, with 1,8 hectares, is added to the Botanical Gardens.

Composition 
The Botanical Garden currently includes:
 The Andresen and Salabert houses,
 An historical garden with three distinct parts (the Rose Garden, the J Letter Garden and the Fish Garden), separated by Camellia japonica hedges,
 Two ponds, one of which with waterlilies,
 Greenhouses, including one dedicated to cacti and other succulent plants and another to tropical plants,
 A cacti and succulent plant collection, featuring many Opuntia, Euphorbia, Agave and Aloe species,
 An arboretum, including a conifer collection, several centenary trees and a specimen of Ginkgo biloba planted by Arnaldo Rozeira.

References

External links 

Botanical gardens in Portugal
University of Porto